Anthony Wambani Atieno (born 7 August 1999) is a Kenyan professional footballer who plays as a midfielder for Vasalund, and the Kenya national team.

Career
Wambani joined the Swedish club Vasalund in 2018 from the Kenyan club Bandari, and helped them achieve promotion into the Superettan in his debut season.

International career
Wambani debuted with the Kenya national team in a 1–0 2019 CECAFA Cup win over Tanzania on 8 December 2019.

References

External links
 
 Svenskfotboll Profile
 NFT Profile

1999 births
Living people
Sportspeople from Nairobi
Kenyan footballers
Kenya international footballers
Superettan players
Ettan Fotboll players
Association football midfielders
Kenyan expatriate sportspeople in Sweden
Kenyan expatriate footballers
Expatriate footballers in Sweden